Refuge Alfred Wills is a mountain hut in the French Alps in Haute-Savoie.

The current shelter, bearing the same name, was built in 1981. At  in altitude, it is the site of the former pasture Anterne more commonly called "Cottages Anterne". It is surrounded by five private cottages.

The shelter is named after Alfred Wills, a British mountaineer and judge of the High Court of England and Wales, he was also a passionate climber. He tackled many Alpine glaciers, wrote several books about his exploits, and became the third president of the Alpine Club, serving from 1863 to 1865.

Arriving at Sixt-Fer-à-Cheval in 1850, Wills fell in love with the area and wanted to build a chalet. In 1859 construction began of what he named "Eagle's Nest", what the inhabitants later called "the Castle". During World War II, when France was under Nazi occupation, it was uninhabited and looted. After the war, repair costs proved to be too high, so the family put it up for sale.

References
 Wills Alfred, Le Nid d'Aigle et l'ascension de Wetterhorn, Paris, éditeur : C. Meyrueis, 1864. ASIN : B0019S0GL0
 Hubert Ducroz, Les débuts de l'alpinisme à Sixt (Haute-Savoie), fascicule édité par l'Association des Amis de la Réserve Naturelle de Sixt Fer-à-Cheval, 1986

External links

Mountain huts in the Alps
Mountain huts in France